In geography, the antipode of any spot on Earth is the point on Earth's surface diametrically opposite to it. A pair of points antipodal to each other are situated such that a straight line connecting the two would pass through Earth's center. Antipodal points are as far away from each other as possible. The North and South Poles are antipodes of each other.

In the Northern Hemisphere, "the Antipodes" may refer to Australia and New Zealand, and Antipodeans to their inhabitants. Geographically, the antipodes of Britain and Ireland are in the Pacific Ocean, south of New Zealand. This gave rise to the name of the Antipodes Islands of New Zealand, which are close to the antipode of London. With the exception of a part of the Perth metropolitan area near Baldivis and Rockingham that is antipodal to Bermuda, the antipodes of Australia are in the North Atlantic Ocean, while parts of Spain, Portugal, France and Morocco are antipodal to New Zealand.

Approximately 15% of land territory is antipodal to other land, representing approximately 4.4% of Earth's surface. Another source estimates that about 3% of Earth's surface is antipodal land. The largest antipodal land masses are the Malay Archipelago, antipodal to the Amazon basin and adjoining Andean ranges; east China and Mongolia, antipodal to Argentina; and Greenland and the Canadian Arctic Archipelago, antipodal to East Antarctica. There is a general paucity of antipodal land because the Southern Hemisphere has comparatively less land than the Northern Hemisphere and, of that, the antipodes of Australia are in the North Atlantic Ocean, while the antipodes of southern Africa are in the Pacific Ocean.

Geography
The antipode of any place on the Earth is the place that is diametrically opposite it, so a line drawn from the one to the other passes through the centre of Earth and forms a true diameter. For example, the antipodes of New Zealand's lower North Island lie in Spain. Most of the Earth's land surfaces have ocean at their antipodes, this being a natural consequence of most of the Earth's surface being covered in water.

The antipode of any place on Earth is distant from it by 180° of longitude and as many degrees to the north of the Equator as the original is to the south (or vice versa); in other words, the latitudes are numerically equal, but one is north and the other south. The maps shown here are based on this relationship; they show a Lambert azimuthal equal-area projection of the Earth, in yellow, overlaid on which is another map, in blue, shifted horizontally by 180° of longitude and inverted about the Equator with respect to latitude.

Noon at one place is midnight at the other (ignoring daylight saving time and irregularly shaped time zones) and, with the exception of the tropics, the longest day at one point corresponds to the shortest day at the other, and midwinter at one point coincides with midsummer at the other. Sunrise and sunset do not quite oppose each other at antipodes due to refraction of sunlight.

Mathematical description

If the geographic coordinates (latitude and longitude) of a point on the Earth's surface are (φ, θ), then the coordinates of the antipodal point are (−φ, θ ± 180°). This relation holds true whether the Earth is approximated as a perfect sphere or as a reference ellipsoid.

In terms of the usual way these geographic coordinates are given, this transformation can be expressed symbolically as

x° N/S y° E/W  ↦  x° S/N (180 − y)° W/E,

Etymology
The word antipodes comes from the Greek: ἀντίποδες (antípodes), plural of ἀντίπους (antipous), "with feet opposite (ours)", from ἀντί (antí, “opposite”) + πούς (poús, “foot”). The Greek word is attested in Plato's dialogue Timaeus, already referring to a spherical Earth, explaining the relativity of the terms "above" and "below":

The term is taken up by Aristotle (De caelo 308a.20), Strabo (Geographica 1.1.13), Plutarch (On the Malice of Herodotus 37) and Diogenes Laërtius (Lives and Opinions of Eminent Philosophers book 3), and was adopted into Latin as antipodes. The Latin word changed its sense from the original "under the feet, opposite side" to "those with the feet opposite", i.e. a bahuvrihi referring to hypothetical people living on the opposite side of the Earth. Medieval illustrations imagine them in some way "inverted", with their feet growing out of their heads, pointing upward.

In this sense, Antipodes first entered English in 1398 in a translation of the 13th century De Proprietatibus Rerum by Bartholomeus Anglicus, translated by John of Trevisa:
(In Modern English: Yonder in Ethiopia are the Antipodes, men that have their feet against our feet.)

The modern English singular antipode arose in the 16th or 17th century as a back-formation from antipodes; antipous or the Latinate antipus would have been closer to the original singular.

Historical significance
Pomponius Mela, the first Roman geographer, asserted that the earth had two habitable zones, a North and South one, but that it would be impossible to get into contact with each other because of the unbearable heat at the Equator (De orbis situ 1.4).

From the time of Augustine of Hippo, the Christian church was skeptical of the notion. Augustine asserted that "it is too absurd to say that some men might have set sail from this side and, traversing the immense expanse of ocean, have propagated there a race of human beings descended from that one first man."

In the Early Middle Ages, Isidore of Seville's widely read encyclopedia presented the term "antipodes" as referring to antichthones (people who lived on the opposite side of the Earth), as well as to a geographical place; these people came to play a role in medieval discussions about the shape of the Earth.  

In 748, in reply to a letter from Boniface, Pope Zachary declared the belief "that beneath the earth there was another world and other men, another sun and moon" to be heretical. In his letter, Boniface had apparently maintained that Vergilius of Salzburg held such a belief.

The antipodes being an attribute of a spherical Earth, some ancient authors used their perceived absurdity as an argument for a flat Earth. However, knowledge of the spherical Earth was widespread during the Middle Ages, only occasionally disputed—the medieval dispute surrounding the antipodes mainly concerned the question whether people could live on the opposite side of the earth: since the torrid clime was considered impassable, it would have been impossible to evangelize them. This posed the problem that Christ told the apostles to evangelize all mankind; with regard to the unreachable antipodes, this would have been impossible. Christ would either have appeared a second time, in the antipodes, or left the damned irredeemable. Such an argument was forwarded by the Spanish theologian Alonso Tostado as late as the 15th century and "St. Augustine doubts" was a response to Columbus's proposal to sail westwards to the Indies.

The author of the Norwegian book Konungs Skuggsjá, from around 1250, discusses the existence of antipodes. He notes that (if they exist) they will see the sun in the north in the middle of the day and that they will have seasons opposite those of the Northern Hemisphere.

Herodotus recorded that Pharaoh Necho II of the 26th Dynasty (610–595 BC) commissioned an expedition of Phoenicians which in three years sailed from the Red Sea around Africa back to the mouth of the Nile, and that "as they sailed on a westerly course round the southern end of Libya (Africa), they had the sun on their right"— to northward of them, proving that they had been in the Southern Hemisphere. The earliest surviving account by a European who had visited the Southern Hemisphere is that of Marco Polo (who, on his way home in 1292, sailed south of the Malay Peninsula). He noted that it was impossible to see the star Polaris from there.

The idea of dry land in the southern climes, the Terra Australis, was introduced by Ptolemy and appears on European maps as an imaginary continent from the 15th century.  Antipodes was what Giovanni Contarini, on his world map of 1506 called the land later named America by Martin Waldseemüller. When the land discovered by Pedro Alvarez Cabral in April 1500, Brazil, was formally named Santa Cruz by the assembled Portuguese court on 20 May 1503, it was also referred to in the  official record of the proceedings as the “Land of the Antipodes”: terra Antipodum.

The land reached by Columbus in 1492 was identified as that of the Antipodes by the diplomatist Peter Martyr who, in a letter he wrote from Barcelona dated 14 May 1493, said: "A few days since, a certain Christopher Columbus, a Ligurian, returned from the Western Antipodes".  Perhaps influenced by this, Fernão Vaz Dourado in his Atlas of 1571 inscribed over the map of Mexico and adjacent parts of America, Tera Antipodum regis Castelle inventa a Xforo Columbo Januensi (Land of the Antipodes, discovered for the King of Castile by Christopher Columbus of Genoa).

In spite of having been discovered relatively late by European explorers, Australia was inhabited very early in human history; the ancestors of the Indigenous Australians reached it at least 50,000 years ago.

True trip "around the world" 
To make the longest distance trip around the planet a traveler would have to pass through a set of antipodal points. All meridians can be crossed in one hemisphere—indeed, this is possible by walking in a several-foot-wide circle around one of the poles—but such trips are shorter than a maximum circumnavigation. In all of these cases, after half of the world has been traversed, every subsequent point will be antipodal to one already visited.

Air travel between antipodes

Non-stop antipodal flights by commercial aircraft (scheduled) 
There are currently no commercial aircraft capable of traveling non-stop between antipodes with a standard full commercial passenger load.

The current world record holder Airbus A350-900ULR, is capable of flying  or roughly 90% of an average antipodal distance. The current world record holder for the longest scheduled passenger flight, Singapore Airlines, utilizes this model in their non-stop Singapore to New York-JFK route SQ23/24.

In 2019, Qantas completed separate non-stop flights taking 19–20 hours to encompass the 16,013 km from New York and 17,016 km from London, both to Sydney, Australia with a limit of 49 passengers on the Boeing 787 Dreamliner and who underwent medical tests on the flight. The London-Sydney direct routes are said to be the world's most profitable ultra-long haul flights annually. Future flights for the same pair of experiments are currently put on hold due to global travel restrictions throughout the COVID-19 pandemic.

Non-stop antipodal flights by commercial aircraft (chartered) 
In March 2021, a Comlux 787-8, registered P4-787, flew a non-scheduled (chartered), non-stop flight from Seoul Incheon to Buenos Aires, which are nearly antipodal points. This set a new record for the longest commercial non-stop flight with paying passengers, covering  in 20 hours 19 minutes.

The business jet variant of the Airbus A350, the ACJ350, which entered into service in 2020, has a range of 20,550 km, enabling it to operate between any two available antipodes.  there are three ACJ350s now in service globally. The owner of the first ACJ350, the German Government, has already taken it on a close to antipodal flight with a flight from Cologne, Germany to Canberra, Australia in November 2020.  The upcoming Boeing business jet variant, the BBJ 777-8, will also have an antipodal reach with its published range of 21,570 km. Both aforementioned variants from Airbus and Boeing are the first aircraft designed to handle flights exceeding the Earth's average antipodal distance of 20,000 km.

Direct flights 
The current record holder for such a flight is Air China's Beijing - Madrid - São Paulo flight which flies .

Future theoretical antipodal routes 
Traveling between them would currently need at least two plane changes.

Other near-antipodes major city pairs include:

List of antipodes

Earth

Around 71% of the Earth's surface is covered by oceans, and seven-eighths of the Earth's land (when excluding Antarctica) is confined to the land hemisphere, so the majority of locations on land do not have land-based antipodes. About 15% of the earth's land has an antipode on land. Rough calculation shows that, of the 29% of the earth that is covered by land, if 15% of that has antipodes on land, then about 4% (0.15 × 29% = 4.35%) of the earth's surface has antipodes that are both land surfaces. Spilhaus estimates this at about 3%.

The two largest human inhabited antipodal areas are located in East Asia (mainly eastern China) and South America (mainly Argentina and Chile). The two largest monolithic antipodal land areas are most of Chile and Argentina along with eastern and central China and Mongolia, and most of Greenland along with a part of Antarctica. The Australian mainland is the largest landmass with its antipodes entirely in ocean, although some locations of mainland Australia and Tasmania are close to being antipodes of islands (Bermuda, Azores, Puerto Rico) in the North Atlantic Ocean. The largest landmass with antipodes entirely on land is the island of Borneo, whose antipodes are in the Amazon rainforest.

Cities
Exact or almost exact antipodes:
 Christchurch (New Zealand) – A Coruña (Spain)
 Levin (New Zealand) – Ávila (Spain)
 Hamilton (New Zealand) – Córdoba (Spain)
 Santa Vitória do Palmar (Brazil) – Jeju (South Korea)
 Torres (Brazil) – Toshima, Kagoshima (Japan)
 Barra do Quaraí (Brazil) – Zhoushan (China)
 Hong Kong – La Quiaca (Argentina)
 Lianyungang (China) – Junín (Argentina)
 Madrid (Spain) – Weber (New Zealand)
 Mangawhai (New Zealand) – Rock of Gibraltar (British overseas territory)
 Masterton (New Zealand) – Segovia (Spain)
 Nelson (New Zealand) – Mogadouro (Portugal)
 Padang (Indonesia) – Esmeraldas (Ecuador)
 Palembang (Indonesia) – Neiva (Colombia)
 Pekanbaru (Indonesia) – Machachi (Ecuador)
 Tauranga (New Zealand) – Jaén (Spain)
 Ulan Ude (Russia) – Puerto Natales (Chile)
 Wellington (capital of New Zealand) – Alaejos (Valladolid, Spain)
 Whangarei (New Zealand) – Tangier (Morocco)
 Wuhai (China) – Valdivia (Chile)
 Wuhu (China) – Rafaela (Argentina)

To within , with at least one major city (population of at least 1 million):
 Auckland (New Zealand) – Seville and Málaga (Andalusia, Spain)
 Beijing (China) – Bahía Blanca (Argentina)
 Nanjing (China) – Rosario (Argentina)
 Shanghai (China) – Salto (Uruguay)
 Taipei (Taiwan) – Asunción (Paraguay)
 Tianjin (China) – Bahía Blanca (Argentina)
 Xi'an (China) – Santiago, or more precisely Rancagua or San Bernardo (Chile)
Taiwan (formerly called Formosa) is partly antipodal to the province of Formosa in Argentina.

Capital cities within  of each other's antipodes:
 Taipei (Taiwan) – Asunción (Paraguay), ~
 Madrid (Spain) – Wellington (New Zealand), ~
 Bogotá (Colombia) – Jakarta (Indonesia), ~

Other major cities or capitals close to being antipodes:
 Rio de Janeiro (Brazil) – Tokyo (Japan); the host cities of successive Summer Olympic Games (2016 and 2020), ~
 Beijing (China) – Buenos Aires (Argentina); both cities have populations in the millions, and have been twinned since 1983, ~
 Shanghai (China) – Buenos Aires (Argentina); Buenos Aires is actually closer (~) to the antipode of Shanghai (Salto, Uruguay) than to the antipode of Beijing (Bahía Blanca)
 Tongchuan (China) – Licantén (Chile)
 Guayaquil (Ecuador) – Medan (Indonesia), ~
 Phnom Penh (Cambodia) – Lima (Peru), ~
 Dili (Timor-Leste) – Paramaribo (Suriname), ~
 Irkutsk (Russia) – Punta Arenas (Chile)
 Suva (Fiji) – Timbuktu (Mali)
 Melbourne and Canberra (Australia) – Azores, Atlantic Ocean (Portugal)
 Cherbourg-en-Cotentin (France) – Antipodes Islands (New Zealand)
 Pago Pago (American Samoa) – Zinder (Niger)
 Barranquilla (Colombia) – Christmas Island (Australia)
 Doha (Qatar) – Pitcairn Island (British overseas territory)
 Hué and Da Nang (Vietnam) – Arequipa (Peru)
 Manila (Philippines) – Cuiabá (Brazil)
 Kuala Lumpur (Malaysia) – Cuenca (Ecuador)
 San Juan (Puerto Rico) – Karratha (Australia)
 Limerick (Ireland) – Campbell Islands (New Zealand)
 Arrecife, Lanzarote (Canary Islands) – Norfolk Island
 Sharm el Sheikh (Egypt) – Rapa Iti (French Polynesia)
 Bangkok (Thailand) – Lima (Peru)
 Quito (Ecuador) – Singapore
 Perth (Australia) – Hamilton (Bermuda)
 Montevideo (Uruguay) – Gwangju (South Korea)

Cities and geographic features
 
This illustrates the old yet correct saying that the sun never sets on the British Empire; the sun still does not set on the Commonwealth of Nations.

The northern part of New Caledonia, an overseas territory of France, is antipodal to some thinly populated desert in Mauritania, a part of the former French West Africa. Portions of Suriname, a former Dutch colony, are antipodal to Sulawesi, an Indonesian island spelled Celebes when it was part of the Netherlands East Indies. Luzon, the largest island of the Philippines, is antipodal to eastern Bolivia. As with the British Empire, the sun set neither on the French Empire, the Dutch Empire, nor the Spanish Empire at their peaks.

Santa Vitória do Palmar, the most southerly town of more than 10,000 people in Brazil, is antipodal to Jeju Island, the southernmost territory of South Korea.

Hawaii is antipodal to parts of Botswana. The Big Island of Hawaii is antipodal to the Okavango Delta in Botswana, with the island's largest city, Hilo, antipodal to Nxai Pan National Park.

Desolate Kerguelen Island is antipodal to an area of thinly inhabited plains on the border between the Canadian provinces of Alberta and Saskatchewan and the US state of Montana. Other Canadian towns with antipodes on Kerguelen Island include: Consul, Nashlyn and Govenlock in the vicinity of Senate, and in Alberta Eagle Butte, Elkwater and Manyberries as well as the Red Coat Trail between Orion, Alberta and Etzikom. The northern part of Liberty County, Montana, especially the communities Goldstone, Fox Crossing and Sage Creek Colony, also have antipodes on Kerguelen Island.

St. Paul Island and Amsterdam Island are antipodal to thinly populated parts of the eastern part of the US state of Colorado. Together with the northern part of Liberty County, Montana, they are the only three areas of the Contiguous United States with antipodes on land.

The north-eastern coast of Alaska from Utqiaġvik (former Barrow) over Prudhoe Bay to the Canadian border, and the coasts of the Canadian territories of Yukon, Northwest Territories, and Nunavut, are antipodal to Antarctica.

The Heard Island and McDonald Islands, an uninhabited Australian territory, is antipodal to an area in central Saskatchewan, including the towns of Leask and Shellbrook.

Tigres Island, the largest uninhabited island of Angola, is approximately antipodal to Johnston atoll, which is the third largest uninhabited island of the United States.

Easter Island is antipodal to an area close to Desert National Park,  from Jaisalmer, India. Serawa is the only village in India to be antipodal to a human settlement. Its neighbouring villages Mokla and the northern part of Bhadasar also have antipodes on Easter Island. All the rest of India has its antipodes in the sea.

Kiritimati, the largest island of Kiribati and the largest coral atoll in the world, is antipodal to Salonga National Park, which is the largest national park of the Democratic Republic of the Congo and the largest tropical rainforest reserve in Africa.

Serra da Estrela Natural Park, the largest natural park of Portugal, is antipodal to Kahurangi National Park, the second largest national park of New Zealand.

South Georgia Island is antipodal to the northernmost part of Sakhalin Island.

Lake Baikal is partially antipodal to the Straits of Magellan.

The Russian Antarctic research base Bellingshausen Station is antipodal to a land location in Russian Siberia.

Rottnest Island, off the coast of Western Australia, is approximately antipodal to Bermuda.

Cocos (Keeling) Islands, an Australian external territory in the Indian Ocean, is almost antipodal to Nicaragua's Corn Islands.

Flores Island, the westernmost island of the Azores, is nearly antipodal to Flinders Island between Tasmania and the Australian mainland.

Point Nemo, the point in the South Pacific Ocean most distant from any other land, is precisely opposite a desolate piece of desert in western Kazakhstan.

By definition, the North Pole and the South Pole are antipodes.

This point lies northeast of Nikunau in the Gilbert Islands and southwest of Baker Island, a United States territory.

As can be seen on the purple/blue map, the Pacific Ocean is so large that it stretches halfway around the world; parts of the Pacific off the coast of Peru are antipodal to parts of the same ocean off the coast of Southeast Asia. For example, the island of Ko Chang—which is the second or third largest island in Thailand—is nearly antipodal to San Lorenzo Island, which is the largest island of Peru.

The antipodes of the Antipodes Islands, considered by early European explorers to be antipodal to the United Kingdom, are the town of Barfleur on France's Cotentin Peninsula.

Countries
The following countries are opposite more than one other country. (Antarctica is considered separately from any territorial claims.)

Countries matching up with just one other country are Morocco, Spain, Chad, Libya, Cameroon (with the Cook Islands of New Zealand); Egypt, Eritrea, Ethiopia (with French Polynesia); Senegal (Vanuatu); the UAE (Pitcairn); Ghana, Ivory Coast (Tuvalu); Burkina Faso (Rotuma in Fiji); Guinea (Solomon Islands); India (Easter Island); Laos, Cambodia, Vietnam, and Thailand (all with Peru); Singapore (Ecuador); Brunei, Palau, Micronesia (all with Brazil); Venezuela and Suriname (Indonesia).

Of these, the larger countries which are entirely antipodal to land are the Philippines, Malaysia, Taiwan, Fiji, Vanuatu, Brunei, and Samoa. Chile was as well prior to its expansion into the Atacama with the War of the Pacific.

Geological features antipodal to impact basins
In a number of cases on extraterrestrial bodies in the Solar System, unusual geologic features (e.g., jumbled terrain or unique volcanic constructs) are located antipodal to major impact basins. It has been hypothesized that this results from focusing of some of the seismic waves (p-waves and surface waves) produced by an impact at its antipode.
 Caloris Basin – "Weird Terrain" (Mercury)
 Mare Orientale – Mare Marginis (The Moon)
 Mare Imbrium – Mare Ingenii (The Moon)
 Hellas Planitia – Alba Mons (Mars)
 Isidis Planitia – Noctis Labyrinthus (Mars)
 Kerwan – Ahuna Mons (Ceres)

In popular culture
 On the TV show Angel, the Deeper Well is a hole that goes through the world, with its entrance in the Cotswolds in England and its antipode in New Zealand.
 At the closing ceremonies of the Rio 2016 Olympics, antipodes were used as a tool to invite viewers to the Tokyo 2020 Olympics, including an image of the video game character Mario using his pipes to travel between Tokyo and Rio, arriving at the closing ceremonies.
 In the 2012 film Total Recall, a gravity train called "The Fall" goes through the center of the Earth to allow people to commute between Western Europe and Australia.
 In 2006, Ze Frank challenged viewers of his daily webcast the show with zefrank to create an "Earth sandwich" by simultaneously placing two pieces of bread at antipodal points on the Earth's surface. The challenge was successfully completed by viewers in Spain and New Zealand.

See also
 Antichthones
 Antipodal hotspot
 Antipodal point
 Antipodes Islands
 Clime
 Pole of inaccessibility
 Spherical Earth

Notes

References

External links

 Antipodes Map Interactive map which draws an imaginary tunnel to the other side of the Earth.
 findLatitudeAndLongitude, interactive tool to show antipodes
 3D dual globe schematic 3D representation of the earth and the anti-earth on the same place.
 Map Tunneling Tool Tunnel to the Other Side of the Earth
 Calculate the other side of the world
 Antipodes  An online and photographic project which pairs webcam images from places on opposite sides of the globe.
 Map Tunneller Find out what part of the earth is directly below you using the interactive maps
 Antipodal hotspots and bipolar catastrophes: Were oceanic large-body impacts the cause?
 Antipode Finder Tool to find the opposite side of the world by city or country.

Physical geography